Christina Krogshede (born 1981) is a Danish team handball player, playing for the club Ajax Heroes and for the Danish women's national handball team.

At the 2010 European Women's Handball Championship she reached the bronze final and placed fourth with the Danish team.

References

1981 births
Living people
Danish female handball players
Handball players at the 2012 Summer Olympics
Olympic handball players of Denmark